The 2019 Men's South American Volleyball Club Championship was the eleventh official edition of the Men's South American Volleyball Club Championship. It was played by six teams from February, 26 to March 2, 2019, in Belo Horizonte, Minas Gerais, Brazil.

Sada Cruzeiro won its forth consecutive title, the sixth overall, and qualified for the 2019 FIVB Volleyball Men's Club World Championship. The American outside hitter Taylor Sander was elected the competition's MVP.

Pools composition

Venue

All the matches were played at the Arena Minas in Belo Horizonte, Brazil.

Preliminary round
All times are Brasília Time (UTC−03:00).

Pool A

|}

|}

Pool B

|}

|}

Final round

Bracket

Fifth place match

|}

Semifinals

|}

Third place match

|}

Final

|}

Final standing

All-Star team
The following players were chosen for the tournament's "All-Star team":

Most Valuable Player
 Taylor Sander (Sada Cruzeiro)
Best Opposite
 Jesús Herrera Jaime (Club Obras Sanitarias)
Best Outside Hitters
 Rodrigo Leão (Sada Cruzeiro)
 Osniel Melgarejo (Club Obras Sanitarias)

Best Setter
 Maximiliano Cavanna (UPCN San Juan)
Best Middle Blockers
 Flávio Gualberto (Minas Tênis Clube)
 Isac Santos (Sada Cruzeiro)
Best Libero
 Matías Salvo (UPCN San Juan)

See also

2019 Women's South American Volleyball Club Championship

References

External links
CSV

Volleyball
South American Volleyball Club Championship
Volleyball
Men's South American Volleyball Club Championship
Sport in Minas Gerais
Men's South American Volleyball Club Championship